Matt Dalton (born July 4, 1986) is a Canadian-South Korean professional ice hockey goaltender who is currently playing for Anyang Halla of the Asia League Ice Hockey and the South Korea men's national ice hockey team.

Career
Dalton played college hockey at Bemidji State University. On April 22, 2009, he was signed as a free agent by the Boston Bruins.

Dalton made his debut with KHL team Vityaz Chekhov on August 14, 2011. Dalton allowed one goal in the opening period but shutout Metallurg Novokuznetsk throughout the rest of the game, earning the win in a 3–1 victory. Dalton played in the KB Euro Ice Hockey Challenge as the starting goaltender for the South Korean national team.

Awards and honours

Junior 
 2005–2006 NAHL Most Valuable Player
 2005–2006 NAHL First All-Star Team
 2005–2006 NAHL All-Rookie First Team
 2005–2006 NAHL Best GAA (1.63)
 2005–2006 NAHL Best Save Percentage (.940)

College 
 2008–2009 NCAA (CHA) Champion
 2008–2009 NCAA (CHA) All-Tournament Team
 2008–2009 NCAA (CHA) Second All-Star Team

Professional 
2010–11: ECHL Goaltender Of The Week (February 14, 2011 – February 20, 2011)
2013–14 Nadezhda Cup Best Goaltender
2014–15 Asia League Best Goaltender
2014–15 Asia League First Team
2015–16 Asia League Champion
2015–16 Asia League Playoff MVP
2016–17 Asia League Best Goaltender
2016–17 Asia League Champion
2016–17 Asia League Playoff MVP
2016–17 Asia League First Team

International 
 2017 World Championship (Division 1A) silver medal

References

External links

1986 births
Living people
Bemidji State Beavers men's ice hockey players
Canadian ice hockey goaltenders
Des Moines Buccaneers players
Ice hockey people from Ontario
Providence Bruins players
Reading Royals players
HC Vityaz players
HL Anyang players
South Korean ice hockey goaltenders
Canadian emigrants to South Korea
Asian Games silver medalists for South Korea
Medalists at the 2017 Asian Winter Games
Asian Games medalists in ice hockey
Ice hockey players at the 2017 Asian Winter Games
Ice hockey players at the 2018 Winter Olympics
Olympic ice hockey players of South Korea
Canadian expatriate ice hockey players in Russia
Canadian expatriate ice hockey players in South Korea
Naturalized citizens of South Korea
Canadian expatriate ice hockey players in the United States